SPAC may refer to:

 São Paulo Athletic Club
 Saratoga Performing Arts Center, Saratoga Springs, New York
 Shaw Performing Arts Centre, Winnipeg, Canada
 Shizuoka Performing Arts Center, Shizuoka, Japan
 Soil plant atmosphere continuum
 South Philippine Adventist College
 Spaç Prison, former prison in Albania
 Special-purpose acquisition company

See also

 
 Space (disambiguation)
 PAC (disambiguation)